Heping District is a district in the center of Tianjin, China. It is named after the He Ping Road, the most prosperous street of the district at the time of renaming in 1956.

The district has a long history. There are six subdistricts divided into 88 residential committees. As of 2020, the district has a total population of 449,100. 

In history, Heping District is the center of culture, commerce and finance in Tianjin. The Tianjin CBD, shopping centres, and banks are concentrated in this District.

From 2006 to 2008, the leader of the district is Li Runlan.

Yaohua High School is located in the district.

All Nippon Airways has its Tianjin Office in Tower 2 of The Exchange in the district.

History 
During the Song dynasty, the lands of today's Heping District was under Qingchi count of Cangzhou. Following the Jingkang incident, Qingchi county, along with most of Song territories north of Yellow River was occupied by Jin dynasty. Jin renamed the county as Jinghai in 1193.

In 1730, Jinghai county was combined into Tianjin. Due to its long distance from the originally city center, the district was sparsely populated and underdeveloped. Since 1860, many part of the district was given to Britain, United States, France and Japan as concessions. With the return of the concessions following the end of World War II, former Japanese and French concessions were grouped into the First District, and the former British concessions was changed into the Tenth District. After the founding of People's Republic of China, the District was divided into the First and Fifth Districts on October 10, 1952. On the first day of 1956, the First and Fifth Districts were renamed to Heping District and Xinhua District respectively, and the Xinhua District was later combined into Heping District on September 9, 1958.

Administrative divisions 
There are six subdistricts in the district:

Transportation

Metro 
Heping District is currently served by two metro lines operated by Tianjin Metro:

   - Xiaobailou, Yingkoudao , Anshandao
   - Xikanglu, Yingkoudao , Hepinglu, Jinwan'guangchang

See also 

 Yaohua High School

References

External links 
 Official website 

Districts of Tianjin